Mecyclothorax lophoides is a species of ground beetle in the subfamily Psydrinae. It was described by Maximilien Chaudoir in 1854.

References

lophoides
Beetles described in 1854